The Coalinga Oil Field is a large oil field in western Fresno County, California, in the United States. It surrounds the town of Coalinga, about halfway between Los Angeles and San Francisco, to the west of Interstate 5, at the foot of the Diablo Range. The principal operators on the field, as of 2008, were Chevron Corp. (formerly Standard Oil of California or SoCal) and Aera Energy LLC.

Setting

Compared to many of the other California oil fields, Coalinga is large and spread out, but contains a few areas of concentrated development around the richer pools.  The field has a rough semicircular shape open to the southeast, approximately twelve miles long by six across, with the town of Coalinga at the southwestern limit of the semicircle, and the agricultural Pleasant Valley inside. The oil field is mainly on the high ground around the valley, with the western part of the semicircle at the base of the Alcalde Hills, and the eastern part on the long and low Anticline Ridge, which separates Pleasant Valley and Coalinga from Interstate 5 and the main part of the San Joaquin Valley.  The anticline in Anticline ridge continues to the southeast as the Guijarral Hills Oil Field and the Kettleman North Dome Oil Field.  California State routes 33 and 198, which join together for the stretch through and north of Coalinga, cut across the Coalinga field and cross Anticline Ridge; along the route a passing traveler has a good view of oil field operations.

As the climate in the region is semiarid to arid, most of the native vegetation is grassland and low scrub.  Areas of particularly dense oil development are almost entirely denuded of vegetation.

Geology and operations

The Coalinga Oil Field is the northernmost of a series of oil fields along anticlines extending along the western margin of the San Joaquin Valley, anticlines which parallel the San Andreas fault and have their origin in compression from associated tectonic processes.  Other anticlinal oil fields in the same series include the Lost Hills, South Belridge, Kettleman Hills, and Cymric fields.  The southernmost, and largest in the series, is the Midway-Sunset Field in the southwestern corner of the valley.

The eastern part of the Coalinga field is a southeast-plunging anticline.    Most of the oil in the Coalinga field comes from a large-scale geologic formation known as the Kregenhagan-Temblor petroleum system, a body of Eocene-age shales rich in organic sediments.  Oil in the field is found in both structural traps such as anticlinal folds, in which oil migrates upwards and is trapped beneath an impermeable layer, and stratigraphic traps, where oil is trapped within a rock unit due to changes within the rock itself.

Drillers have found a total of four oil pools in the Coalinga field. The first to be discovered was the "Oil City" pool of Cretaceous age, discovered in 1887 or 1888; however, it had little yield.

The Coalinga Oil Field is a mature field, and closer to exhaustion than most of the other major fields in California. In the San Joaquin Valley, only the Buena Vista Oil Field and Kettleman North Dome Oil Field are closer to exhaustion, with about one percent and one-half of one percent of their original oil remaining, respectively.

Oil from the Etchegoin-Temblor pool on the westside is heavy crude, with a specific gravity of 11-18 API, and a relatively low sulfur content of 0.75%; oil from the Temblor pools on the Eastside is more variable, ranging from heavy to medium crude, having an API index of 12 to 30.  
Aera Energy, LLC sends its oil from the Coalinga field to its refinery in Martinez for processing.

History

Oil was known in the Coalinga area long before the arrival of Europeans, as the Native Americans in the region used the tarry substance from natural seeps as lining for baskets, as well as for trade.  The first attempt to drill for oil was in 1867, but success was limited both due to the difficulty of transporting oil at the time, and the relative disinterest in petroleum prior to the era of motorized transport.

In 1890 the first oil boom began, once the Southern Pacific had extended its rail line into the town of Coalinga. Around the "Oil City" area of the Coalinga Field, directly north of the modern-day town of Coalinga, several large gushers attracted attention, gushers still being a relatively new occurrence in the oil industry.

The huge and productive Temblor oil pools were discovered around 1900, and by 1910 the field was the most richly productive oil field in California, exceeding those in the Los Angeles Basin for the first time.

A dramatic oil gusher erupted in Sept. 1909 at the "Silver Tip" well, producing 20,000 barrels a day, the biggest gusher in California until then.  This was an event of such excitement that Los Angeles Stock Exchange closed down for a day so that its members could come by train to view it.  This gusher would be dwarfed a year later by the colossal Lakeview Gusher, by which California's largest oil field, the Midway-Sunset in Kern County, was first known.

In the early years of the field, competition was fierce between different oil companies, with a particularly sharp conflict between a group of independent oil producers and Standard Oil, which operated as a gigantic trust until its breakup by the U.S. Supreme Court in 1911.  According to an article published in the New York Times in 1905, Standard attempted to force its competitors out of business by artificially holding down the price of oil to as little as ten cents a barrel.  The Coalinga independents responded by building a pipeline to San Francisco Bay, the construction of which was itself obstructed by continuous harassment from Standard, until the independents were finally successful by ruse:  secretly building a real pipeline, while simultaneously seeming to work on a "dummy" pipeline in a more prominent location.  During this time, the independent operators also accused the Southern Pacific Railroad of working in conjunction with Standard to put them out of business.

The operators of the Coalinga field attained peak production in 1912 –  of oil – a value which was to decline steadily for the next several decades.

During the 1960s and 1970s, enhanced recovery technologies such as water flooding, steam flooding, fire flooding, and polymer flooding were employed to increase the declining productivity of the field, and to reach and recover previously submarginal deposits.  Even with such methods, the current oil output of the field has declined considerably from the early part of the 20th century:  in 2006, the field's operators reported  of oil pumped.

References
 California Oil and Gas Fields, Volumes I, II and III.  Vol. I (1998), Vol. II (1992), Vol. III (1982).  California Department of Conservation, Division of Oil, Gas, and Geothermal Resources (DOGGR).  1,472 pp. Coalinga Field information pp. 96–98. PDF file available on CD from www.consrv.ca.gov.
 California Department of Conservation, Oil and Gas Statistics, Annual Report, December 31, 2006.

Notes

External links

100 Years of Oil, from the Bakersfield Californian:  stories about San Joaquin Valley oilfields
Approximate center of the field, in Google Maps

Oil fields in California
Oil Field
Geology of Fresno County, California
Geography of Fresno County, California
Geography of the San Joaquin Valley
Buildings and structures in Fresno County, California